The 1931 Missouri Tigers football team was an American football team that represented the University of Missouri in the Big Six Conference (Big 6) during the 1931 college football season. The team compiled a 2–8 record (1–4 against Big 6 opponents), finished in a tie for fifth place in the Big 6, and was outscored by all opponents by a combined total of 183 to 72. Gwinn Henry was the head coach for the ninth of nine seasons. The team played its home games at Memorial Stadium in Columbia, Missouri.

The team's leading scorer was George Stuber with 18 points.

Schedule

References

Missouri
Missouri Tigers football seasons
Missouri Tigers football